The 1979 FIBA Intercontinental Cup William Jones was the 13th edition of the FIBA Intercontinental Cup for men's basketball clubs. It took place at Ginásio do Ibirapuera, São Paulo, Brazil.

Participants

League stage
Day 1, October 2 1979

|}

Day 2, October 3 1979

|}

Day 3, October 4 1979

|}

Day 4, October 5 1979

|}

Day 5, October 6 1979

|}

Final standings

External links
 1979 Intercontinental Cup William Jones

1979
1979–80 in European basketball
1979–80 in South American basketball
1979–80 in North American basketball
1979 in Brazilian sport
International basketball competitions hosted by Brazil